Megachile simplicipes is a species of bee in the family Megachilidae. It was described by Friese in 1921.

References

Simplicipes
Insects described in 1921